Keteke (Akan: Train) is a 2017 Ghanaian comedy film written, directed by Peter Sedufia. Produced by Peter Sedufia and Laurene Addy

Plot 
The film is set in the 1980s, when pregnant Atswei (Lydia Forson) and her husband Boi (Adjetey Anang) are trying to reach Atswei's village so she can give birth. The only source of transportation is a weekly train that they miss, forcing them to seek alternative transportation and launching them on an impromptu adventure through rural Ghana.

Awards 
Keteke represented Ghana at the annual Khouribja Africa Festival in Morocco, December 2018 where it received the Jury Special Mention Prize.

Cast
Edwin Acquah
Fred Nii Amugi
Adjetey Anang
Lydia Forson
Jeneral Ntatia
Edmund Onyame
Joseph Otsi
Raymond Sarfo
Clemento Suarez

References

Ghanaian comedy films
2010s English-language films
English-language Ghanaian films